The men's 90 kilograms (Middleweight) competition at the 2014 Asian Games in Incheon was held on 22 September at the Dowon Gymnasium.

Schedule
All times are Korea Standard Time (UTC+09:00)

Results

Main bracket

Final

Top half

Bottom half

Repechage

References

External links
Official website

M90
Judo at the Asian Games Men's Middleweight